The 1973 RAC Rally (formally the 22nd Daily Mirror RAC Rally) was the twelfth round of the inaugural World Rally Championship season.  Run in mid-November in the County of Yorkshire in England, the rally was run primarily on gravel, with some sections of tarmac as well. The rally carried the name of its title sponsor, a popular British newspaper, The Daily Mirror.

Report 
In 1973, and for several years afterward, only manufacturers were given points for finishes in WRC events. Britain was home terrain for the Fords and the RS1600 wrapped up all three podium spots. While both Alpine Renault and Fiat finished in the points, neither had their points applied to championship standings. This, however, didn't hurt either one's chances, as they still placed first and second respectively at the end of the season.

Results 

Source: Independent WRC archive

Championship standings after the event

References

External links 
 Official website of the World Rally Championship
 1973 RAC Rally at Rallye-info 

RAC
Rally GB
RAC